Arpookara/Arpookkara (Malayalam: ആർപ്പൂക്കര) is a rural village in Kottayam district in the state of Kerala, India. The saint Alphonsa of the Immaculate Conception was born in Arpookara on 1910. This village belongs to the Kuttanad region of Kerala.

The Kottayam Medical College is situated in Arpookara. The main attraction is the backwaters in Arpookara. There are beautiful lakes and paddy fields.

Demographics 

 India census, Arpookara had a population of 23,538 with 11,629 males and 11,909 females.

Landmarks

 Medical College Hospital, Gandhinagar
Medical College Vocational Higher Secondary School, Ambalakkavala
 Medical College Higher Secondary School, Ambalakkavala
 St. Philomina's Girls High School, Villoonni
 Government High School, Karippoothettu
 Adarsam Library, Nerekadavu, Arpookkara, Kottayam
 Navodaya Grandhasala, Karippoothettu, Arpookkara, Kottayam
 Pranavam Group Arts and Sports Club, Near Kolettu Temple Jn. Panampalam, Arpookkara, Kottayam-8
 School of Medical Education, Gandhinagar 
Kuttanad Irrigation Development Sub Division, Arpookara.

Places of Worships 
 Sree Subrahmonya Swami Kshethram, Ambalakkavala, Arpookkara, Kottayam
 Kolettu Sree Shanmugha Vilasam Temple, Panampalam, Arpookkara, Kottayam
 Choorakavu Devi Temple & Karipoothrikka Sreekrishna Temple, Thommankavala, Arpookkara, Kottayam
 Kunnathrikka Mahadeva Kshethram, Arpookkara, Kottayam
 St. Xaviers church Villooni Arpookara 
 St. Micheles Chapel Panampalam, Arpookkara, Kottayam
 St.George Orthodox Church  (Manalel palli) Arpookara, Kottyam 
 St. George Church Aykkarachira, Arpookkara, Kottayam
 Saint Alphonsa's (Muttathupadom) Birthplace, Arpookkara, Kottayam
 Little Flower Church (Cherupushpam Palli), Arpookkara, Kottayam
 Sreenarayana Gurudeva Kshethram SNDP Br. 3502, Arpookara (N), Kottayam
 St. Sebastian's Church, Angadi (Angadi Palli), Arpookkara, Kottayam
 St. Peters C.S.I Church Arpookara (Kumaramkunnu) Kottayam

References

Arpookara Panchayat

Villages in Kottayam district